is a private junior college in Ashiya, Hyōgo, Japan.

History 
The college was established in 1960. In 2011, it became coeducational, adopting the present name at the same time.

Courses
 Early childhood education
 Homemaking
 English studies
 Personal care

External links 
  

Japanese junior colleges
Educational institutions established in 1960
Private universities and colleges in Japan
Universities and colleges in Hyōgo Prefecture